The 18th Legislative Assembly of British Columbia sat from 1934 to 1937. The members were elected in the British Columbia general election held in November 1933. The Liberal Party, led by Thomas Dufferin Pattullo, formed the government. The Co-operative Commonwealth Federation (CCF) formed the official opposition.

Henry George Thomas Perry served as speaker for the assembly.

Members of the 18th General Assembly 
The following members were elected to the assembly in 1933.:

Notes:

Party standings

By-elections 
By-elections were held to replace members for various reasons:

Notes:

Other changes 
In August 1936 Robert Connell, Ernest Bakewell, John Price and Robert Swailes leave the CCF to create the Social Constructives.
Vancouver Centre (res. Gordon McGregor Sloan appointed to Court of Appeal, April 5, 1937) 
Cariboo (res. Donald Morrison MacKay appointed Commissioner of Indian Affairs 1937)

References 

Political history of British Columbia
Terms of British Columbia Parliaments
1934 establishments in British Columbia
1937 disestablishments in British Columbia
20th century in British Columbia